

"Chicago" (often listed as "Chicago / We Can Change the World") is the debut solo single by English singer-songwriter Graham Nash, released in 1971 from his debut solo album Songs for Beginners. The song reached number 35 on the US Billboard Hot 100 chart and number 29 on the Cash Box Top 100. It is his highest-charting single. In Canada, "Chicago" peaked at number 19. The song also made the Dutch charts in 1971, peaking at number 5.

Background
The title and lyrics of the song refer to the anti-Vietnam War protests that took place during the 1968 Democratic National Convention in Chicago and the subsequent trial of the Chicago Eight, where protest leaders were charged with conspiracy to incite a riot. The first line of the song, "So your brother's bound and gagged, and they've chained him to a chair", refers to Black Panther leader Bobby Seale, the sole African-American defendant, who was gagged and chained to a chair in the courtroom following repeated outbursts in protest of rulings by Judge Julius Hoffman.

The line "Won't you please come to Chicago just to sing?" refers to Nash pleading with bandmates Stephen Stills and Neil Young to come to Chicago to play a benefit concert for the Chicago 8 defense fund. The chorus contains the lines, "We can change the world / Rearrange the World".

On the Crosby, Stills, Nash & Young live album, 4 Way Street (1971), Nash dedicates the song to "Mayor Daley", a sardonic reference to Chicago mayor Richard J. Daley, who was notoriously antagonistic towards anti-war protesters. CSN and CSNY played the song live throughout their career.

In June 2008, in Denver, Colorado, CSN played a slightly rewritten version of the song called "Denver", in anticipation of the 2008 Democratic National Convention.

Chart performance

Weekly charts

Year-end charts

Personnel 
Graham Nash–vocals, guitar, piano, organ, tambourine
Chris Ethridge–bass
Johnny Barbata–drums, tambourine
Venetta Fields, Sherlie Matthews, Clydie King, Dorothy Morrison, Rita Coolidge–backing vocals

Sherbet cover 
In 1973, Australian band Sherbet recorded an extended version of Chicago for their album On with the Show, which went for over 10 minutes. Sherbet also performed a live version of the song on Australian TV show GTK.

David Gilmour cover 
In August 2009, Pink Floyd's David Gilmour released an online version, titled "Chicago - Change the World", on which he sang and played guitar, bass and keyboards, to promote awareness of the plight of Gary McKinnon. It featured Chrissie Hynde and Bob Geldof, plus McKinnon himself, and was made with Nash's support.

Hip hop samples 
In 1999, the rappers Kanye West and Beanie Sigel sampled Chicago on the single "The Truth"; in 2003, Westside Connection used the same sample for their single "Gangsta Nation".

References 

1971 songs
1971 debut singles
Atlantic Records singles
Graham Nash songs
Songs about Chicago
Protest songs
Songs written by Graham Nash